Kaghtsrashen is a village in the Artashat Municipality of the Ararat Province of Armenia.

References 

World Gazeteer: Armenia – World-Gazetteer.com

Kiesling, Rediscovering Armenia, p. 27, available online at the US embassy to Armenia's website

Populated places in Ararat Province